Sirawai, officially the Municipality of Sirawai (Subanen: Benwa Sirawai; Chavacano: Municipalidad de Sirawai), is a 4th class municipality in the province of Zamboanga del Norte, Philippines. According to the 2020 census, it has a population of 31,163 people.

Geography

Barangays
Sirawai is politically subdivided into 34 barangays.

Climate

Demographics

Economy

References

External links
 Sirawai Profile at PhilAtlas.com
Sirawai Municipality Website
 [ Philippine Standard Geographic Code]
Philippine Census Information

Municipalities of Zamboanga del Norte